Sandeid is a village in Vindafjord municipality in Rogaland county, Norway.

Sandeid has a slaughterhouse, sand pits, and a cement factory.  Sandeid Church is also located in the village.

History
The village was the administrative centre for many years.  It was the administrative centre of the old municipality of Sandeid from 1923 until 1965 when Sandeid was merged into Vindafjord municipality.  The village was then the administrative centre of the municipality of Vindafjord from 1965 until 2006. In 2006, the municipality of Ølen was merged with Vindafjord.  Since 2006, the administrative centre of Vindafjord has been the village of Ølensjøen in what was previously Ølen municipality.

References

Villages in Rogaland
Vindafjord